Berton is a both a surname and a given name. Notable people with the name include:

As a surname
Alain Berton, (1912–1979), French chemical engineer specialized in toxicology 
Annibale Berton (born 1936), Italian Olympic canoeist
George Frederick Street Berton (1808–1840), Canadian lawyer from New Brunswick
Giuseppe Berton (1932–2013), Italian missionary
Henri Berton (fl. 1908), French Olympic archer
Henri-Montan Berton (1767–1844), French composer
John Berton (contemporary), American computer graphics animator and visual effects artist
Liliane Berton (1924–2009), French opera singer and recording artist
Louis des Balbes de Berton de Crillon, 1st Duke of Mahón (1717–1796), French soldier during the Seven Years' War; later joined the Spanish army
Louis des Balbes de Berton de Crillon (1541–1615), French soldier
Marie-Hélène Crombé-Berton (born 1960), Belgian politician of the Mouvement Réformateur party
Pierre Berton (1920–2004), Canadian author, historian, and journalist
Pierre Montan Berton (1727–1780), French composer and conductor, father of Henri Montan Berton
Sean Berton (born 1979), American professional football player
Stefania Berton (born 1990), Italian figure skater and ice dancer
Vic Berton (1896–1951), American jazz drummer

As a given name
Berton Averre (born 1952), American rock guitarist
Berton Braley (1898–1956), German poet
Berton Churchill (1876–1940), Canadian actor
Berton E. Spivy Jr. (1911–1997), United States Army general
Berton Roueché (1910–1994), American medical writer
John Berton Carnett (1890–1988), American surgeon

See also
Burton (name)
Barton (surname)
Barton (given name)